Stenoptilia pinarodactyla is a moth of the family Pterophoridae. It is known from Japan (Hokkaido) and Siberia.

External links
Taxonomic and Biological Studies of Pterophoridae of Japan (Lepidoptera)
Japanese Moths

pinarodactyla
Moths of Japan
Moths of Asia
Moths described in 1877